The 2008 season was the Denver Broncos' 39th in the National Football League (NFL), their 49th overall and their 25th under the ownership of Pat Bowlen. The Broncos improved from their 7–9 record from 2007, but failed to make the playoffs with an 8–8 record.

Entering Week 15, the Broncos had an 8–5 record — three games ahead of the San Diego Chargers for the AFC West division title. The Chargers ended the season on a four-game winning streak, while the Broncos ended the season on a three-game losing streak, losing 52–21 to the San Diego Chargers in the regular season finale. The Broncos and Chargers both finished 8–8, however, the Broncos lost the tiebreaker due to the Chargers' owning a better division record (5–1 to 3–3). On December 30, 2008, two days after the regular season ended, Mike Shanahan was fired as the Broncos' head coach after 14 seasons.

Coaching staff

Roster changes
On February 29, 2008, LB Ian Gold and WR Javon Walker were released by the Denver Broncos in preparation for the NFL Draft and free agency.  Walker was signed by the Oakland Raiders.  Long-time Broncos kicker Jason Elam was not re-signed by the Broncos, and was then signed by the Atlanta Falcons.

On June 2, 2008, RB Travis Henry was cut by the team. Seventh Round pick Josh Barrett signed on June 12, the first draft pick to sign with the team.  Wide receiver Rod Smith, a veteran of both of the Broncos Super Bowl victories, retired on the first day of training camp.

NFL draft

Draft notes

Schedule

Training camp
The Broncos opened training camp on July 24, 2008. On July 31, 2008, the Broncos granted safety John Lynch his release.  The following day, head coach Mike Shanahan, asked about the upcoming season on talk radio, said "We’re not going to miss the playoffs."  Later in the day, Shanahan backed off a bit, saying "I didn’t make a guarantee . . . . you’ve got to be lucky and don’t have the injuries we’ve had. If we don’t have the injuries, I’d be very disappointed if we didn’t make the playoffs."

Preseason

Regular season

Note: Intra-division opponents are in bold text.

Game summaries

Week 1: at Oakland Raiders

The Broncos began their 2008 campaign on the road against their AFC West rival, the Oakland Raiders, in the second game of ESPN's Monday Night Football doubleheader.  In the first quarter, Denver ran out of the gates early as QB Jay Cutler completed a 26-yard TD pass to rookie WR Eddie Royal (who was filling in for WR Brandon Marshall, due to his 1-game suspension).  In the second quarter, the Broncos continued their domination as kicker Matt Prater got a 26-yard field goal, while FB Michael Pittman got a 3-yard TD run.  In the third quarter, Denver ran away with the game as Cutler completed a 48-yard TD pass to WR Darrell Jackson, while Prater nailed a 43-yard field goal.  In the fourth quarter, the Raiders spoiled the Broncos' bid for a shutout as QB JaMarcus Russell completed an 8-yard TD pass to WR Ashley Lelie.  Denver ended its domination with RB Selvin Young's 5-yard TD run and Pittman's 1-yard TD run.  Oakland ended the scoring with Russell completing a 4-yard TD pass to WR Ronald Curry.

With the dominating win, the Broncos began their season at 1–0; with the rest of the division suffering losses, Denver, in Week 1, is in sole possession of 1st place.

Eddie Royal, in his NFL debut, had the best Week 1 stats of any wide receiver, getting 9 receptions for 146 yards and a touchdown.

Week 2: vs San Diego Chargers

Coming off their dominating divisional road win over the Raiders, the Broncos played their Week 2 home opener against the AFC West foe, the San Diego Chargers.  In the first quarter, Denver was first out of the gate as FB Michael Pittman got a 1-yard TD run.  The Chargers responded with kicker Nate Kaeding getting a 34-yard field goal.  In the second quarter, Denver replied with QB Jay Cutler completing a 3-yard and a 14-yard TD pass to TE Tony Scheffler.  San Diego immediately responded with RB Darren Sproles returning the kickoff 103 yards for a touchdown, yet the Broncos replied with rookie kicker Matt Prater getting a 52-yard field goal.  The Chargers struck as their lead as QB Philip Rivers completed a 48-yard TD pass to WR Chris Chambers, yet Denver retaliated with Cutler completing a 6-yard TD pass to WR Brandon Marshall.

In the third quarter, San Diego started to rally as Rivers completed a 15-yard TD pass to Chambers, and Kaeding kicked a 21-yard field goal. In the fourth quarter, the Chargers took the lead with Kaeding's 28-yard field goal and Rivers' 66-yard TD pass to Sproles. The Broncos responded with a 12-play, 80-yard drive (which included a controversial officiating call that turned a Cutler fumble into an incomplete pass) that was capped off with Cutler's 4-yard TD pass to rookie WR Eddie Royal, followed by Cutler's successful 2-point conversion pass to Royal.

With an exciting win, Denver improved to 2–0.

Brandon Marshall's 18 receptions was a single-game franchise record and tied for second most in league history.

Week 3: vs. New Orleans Saints

Coming off their last-second win over the Chargers, the Broncos stayed at home, donned their alternate uniforms, and played a Week 3 interconference duel with the New Orleans Saints. In the first quarter, Denver drew first blood as QB Jay Cutler completed a 1-yard TD pass to TE Nate Jackson. The Saints answered with kicker Martín Gramática getting a 43-yard field goal, yet Denver replied with Cutler completing a 35-yard TD pass to WR Brandon Marshall. In the second quarter, the Broncos increased its lead as LB Nate Webster returned a fumble 34 yards for a touchdown. The Saints started to rally as RB Pierre Thomas got a 5-yard TD run, while RB Reggie Bush got a 23-yard TD run, yet Denver answered with kicker Matt Prater getting a 27-yard field goal. New Orleans closed out the half with DE Charles Grant tackling RB Andre Hall in his endzone for a safety.

In the third quarter, the Broncos replied with RB Michael Pittman getting a 2-yard TD run. The Saints answered with QB Drew Brees completing a 6-yard TD pass to Bush, yet Denver responded with Prater nailing a 34-yard field goal. In the fourth quarter, New Orleans tried to rally as Thomas got a 10-yard TD run (with a failed 2-point conversion). The Saints recovered a fumble, but Gramática's go-ahead 43-yard field goal went wide right, preserving the victory for Denver.

With the win, the Broncos improved to 3–0.

Week 4: at Kansas City Chiefs

The Kansas City Chiefs got off to a good start after they forced the Denver Broncos to punt. This was followed with a 65-yard run by Larry Johnson to set up a 23-yard field goal kick by Nick Novak, putting the Chiefs on top 3–0. After recovering an Eddie Royal fumble early on Denver's next drive, Kansas City again failed to make it to the end zone and a 21-yard field goal by Novak put the Chiefs up 6–0.

The Broncos responded with an 8-play, 9-minute drive in the second quarter that ended in a touchdown pass from Jay Cutler to Brandon Marshall, putting the Broncos briefly in the lead, 7–6. Later in the quarter, a fumble by Marshall was returned to the Broncos' 2-yard line by the Chiefs, followed 2 plays later by a Johnson touchdown run, putting the Chiefs up 13–7. The Broncos got the ball back, but a 28-yard field goal by Matt Prater went wide right. After forcing the Chiefs to punt, the Broncos got the ball back and Prater hit a 56-yarder near the end of the half, drawing the Broncos within 13–10.

The second half began with a Denver drive that resulted in a 51-yard Prater field goal, tying the game at 13–13. The Chiefs answered with a 43-yard Novak field goal, putting them back on top 16–13. On the next drive, Cutler threw an interception. However, Kansas City's very next play was a Larry Johnson fumble recovered by Denver, although 2 plays later Cutler threw another interception. Despite this exchange of turnovers (3 turnovers in 4 plays), there was no scoring for the rest of the 3rd quarter.

Early in the fourth quarter, the Chiefs extended their lead to 23–13 with a 10-yard touchdown pass from Damon Huard to Tony Gonzalez. The Broncos, however, failed to capitalize on a sustained 16-play, 75-yard drive and settled with a Prater field goal, cutting the lead to 23–16. The Chiefs and Broncos then each got field goals on their next drives, bringing the score to 26–16. The Chiefs got a good return after the Prater field goal and put the game away with a 16-yard touchdown run from Johnson. With the 33–19 victory, the Chiefs snapped a league-leading 12-game losing streak dating back to week 7 of the 2007 season.

Larry Johnson carried the Chiefs with 198 rushing yards and 2 touchdowns. Huard managed the game well for the Chiefs, throwing 21/28 for 160 yards and 1 touchdown. Denver was hurt by 4 turnovers compared to just 1 for the Chiefs, but despite 2 interceptions, Cutler still was able to throw for 361 yards on 29/49 passing.

Week 5: vs. Tampa Bay Buccaneers

Hoping to rebound from their divisional road loss to the Chiefs, the Broncos went home for a Week 5 interconference duel with the Tampa Bay Buccaneers.  In the first quarter, Denver trailed early as Bucs kicker Matt Bryant got a 33-yard field goal.  In the second quarter, the Broncos took the lead as kicker Matt Prater got a 55-yard and a 40-yard field goal.  Tampa Bay tied the game at halftime as Bryant kicked a 31-yard field goal.  In the third quarter, Denver took a big lead as QB Jay Cutler completed a 10-yard TD pass to WR Brandon Stokley.  In the fourth quarter, the Broncos increased its lead as Prater nailed a 27-yard field goal.  The Buccaneers rallied with a 7-yard TD pass from QB Jeff Garcia WR Ike Hilliard.  However, Denver recovered the onside kick and drained the clock.

With the win, the Broncos improved to 4–1.

Week 6: vs. Jacksonville Jaguars

Coming off their win over the Buccaneers, the Broncos stayed at home for a Week 6 duel with the Jacksonville Jaguars.  In the first quarter, Denver struck first as QB Jay Cutler completed an 11-yard TD pass to WR Brandon Stokley.  The Jaguars responded as kicker Josh Scobee got a 48-yard field goal.  In the second quarter, Jacksonville took the lead as RB Maurice Jones-Drew got a 1-yard TD run.

In the third quarter, Jacksonville increased their lead as Jones-Drew got a 46-yard TD run.  The Broncos tried to catch up as kicker Matt Prater got a 39-yard field goal, yet the Jaguars answered with QB David Garrard completing a 30-yard TD pass to TE Marcedes Lewis.  In the fourth quarter, Denver tried to come back as Cutler completed an 11-yard TD pass to TE Daniel Graham, but Jacksonville's defense stiffened, preventing any further scoring opportunities.

With the loss, the Broncos fell to 4–2.

Week 7: at New England Patriots

Hoping to rebound from their home loss to the Jaguars, the Broncos flew to Gillette Stadium for a Week 7 Monday Night duel with the New England Patriots.  In the first quarter, Denver trailed early as Patriots kicker Stephen Gostkowski nailed a 31-yard and a 40-yard field goal.  In the second quarter, New England increased its lead with RB Sammy Morris getting a 4-yard TD run, along with QB Matt Cassel completing a 13-yard TD pass to WR Randy Moss.  In the third quarter, the Broncos continued to struggle as Cassel hooked up with Moss again on a 27-yard TD pass, along with completing a 6-yard TD pass to WR Wes Welker.  In the fourth quarter, Denver avoided a shutout loss as QB Jay Cutler completing a 10-yard TD pass to former Patriots TE Daniel Graham.  The Patriots sealed the win with RB BenJarvus Green-Ellis getting a 1-yard TD run.

With the loss, the Broncos went into their bye week at 4–3.

Week 9: vs. Miami Dolphins

Coming off their bye week, the Broncos went home for a Week 9 duel with the Miami Dolphins.  In the first quarter, Denver trailed early as Dolphins kicker Dan Carpenter got a 45-yard and a 47-yard field goal, along with CB Will Allen returning an interception 32 yards for a touchdown.  The Broncos answered with QB Jay Cutler completing a 2-yard TD pass to rookie WR Eddie Royal.  In the second quarter, Miami answered with Carpenter getting a 23-yard field goal.

In the third quarter, Denver tried to rally as kicker Matt Prater got a 50-yard field goal.  In the fourth quarter, the Dolphins replied with Carpenter nailing a 41-yard field goal.  The Broncos tried to come back as Cutler completed a 1-yard TD pass to rookie FB Peyton Hillis.  However, Miami pulled away as RB Ronnie Brown got a 2-yard TD run.

With their third-straight loss, Denver fell to 4–4.

Week 10: at Cleveland Browns

Hoping to rebound from their home loss to the Dolphins, the Broncos flew to Cleveland Browns Stadium for a Week 10 Thursday night duel with the Cleveland Browns.  In the first quarter, Denver struck first as rookie RB Ryan Torain got a 1-yard TD run.  The Browns responded with QB Brady Quinn completing a 5-yard TD pass to TE Kellen Winslow II.  In the second quarter, Cleveland took the lead as kicker Phil Dawson got a 24-yard field goal and Quinn hooking up with Winslow again on a 16-yard TD pass.  The Broncos answered with kicker Matt Prater getting a 35-yard field goal.  The Browns closed out the half with Dawson making a 52-yard field goal.

In the third quarter, Denver continued to struggle as Dawson gave Cleveland a 33-yard field goal.  Denver replied with Prater making a 30-yard field goal.  In the fourth quarter, the Broncos regained the lead as QB Jay Cutler completed a 93-yard TD pass to rookie WR Eddie Royal and a 27-yard TD pass to TE Daniel Graham.  The Browns answered with RB Jamal Lewis getting a 1-yard TD run.  Afterwards, Denver sealed the win as Cutler completed an 11-yard TD pass to WR Brandon Marshall.

With the win, the Broncos improved to 5–4.

This also marked Denver's eighth-straight victory over Cleveland.

Cutler had a career game, completing 24 of 42 passes for a career-best 447 yards, along with 3 touchdowns and 1 interception.

Week 11: at Atlanta Falcons

Coming off their Thursday night road win over the Browns, the Broncos flew to the Georgia Dome for a Week 11 interconference duel with the Atlanta Falcons.  In the first quarter, Denver drew first blood as rookie FB Peyton Hillis got a 7-yard TD run.  The Falcons answered with former Broncos kicker Jason Elam getting a 46-yard field goal.  In the second quarter, Atlanta took the lead as Elam made a 36-yard field goal, while RB Michael Turner got a 9-yard TD run. This is still Matt Ryan's only loss at the Georgia Dome to date.

In the third quarter, Denver regained the lead as Hillis got a 2-yard TD run.  In the fourth quarter, the Broncos increased their lead as kicker Matt Prater nailed a 20-yard field goal.  The Falcons tried to rally as Turner got a 28-yard TD run, yet Denver replied as QB Jay Cutler completed a 9-yard TD pass to TE Daniel Graham.

With the win, the Broncos improved to 6–4.

On a side note, rookie FB Spencer Larsen became the first player in franchise history to start on offense and defense.  In addition to his fullback duties, he also started as middle linebacker, along with his special teams responsibilities.

Week 12: vs. Oakland Raiders

Coming off their road win over the Falcons, the Broncos went home for a Week 12 AFC West rematch with the Oakland Raiders.  After a scoreless first quarter, Denver trailed in the second quarter as Raiders kicker Sebastian Janikowski got a 26-yard field goal.  The Broncos responded with kicker Matt Prater getting a 44-yard field goal, yet the Raiders got the halftime lead as WR Johnnie Lee Higgins returned a punt 89 yards for a touchdown.

In the third quarter, Denver tied the game again as rookie FB Peyton Hillis got a 6-yard TD run.  However, Oakland replied with RB Darren McFadden getting a 1-yard TD run.  In the fourth quarter, the Raiders pulled away as QB JaMarcus Russell completed a 4-yard TD pass to WR Ashley Lelie (a former Bronco), while McFadden got another 1-yard TD run.

With the surprising loss, Denver fell to 6–5.

Week 13: at New York Jets

Hoping to rebound from their home loss to the Raiders, the Broncos flew to The Meadowlands for a Week 13 duel with the New York Jets, considered one of the best teams in the league, fresh off their victory over the undefeated Tennessee Titans. In the first quarter, Denver drew first blood as safety Vernon Fox returned a fumble 23 yards for a touchdown.  The Jets responded with RB Thomas Jones getting a 59-yard TD run.  The Broncos answered with QB Jay Cutler completing a 59-yard TD pass to rookie WR Eddie Royal, along with kicker Matt Prater getting a 25-yard field goal.  In the second quarter, New York drew close as Jones got a 29-yard TD run.  The Broncos replied with rookie RB Peyton Hillis getting a 1-yard TD run, while Prater got a 35-yard field goal.

In the third quarter, the Jets tried to rally as kicker Jay Feely nailed a 30-yard field goal.  In the fourth quarter, Denver pulled away as Cutler completed a 36-yard TD pass to WR Brandon Stokley.

With the win, the Broncos improved to 7–5.

Week 14: vs. Kansas City Chiefs

Fresh off their road win over the Jets, the Broncos went home, donned their alternate uniforms again, and played a Week 14 AFC West rematch with the Kansas City Chiefs.  Denver trailed early in the first quarter as Chiefs kicker Connor Barth made a 26-yard field goal, along with CB Maurice Leggett returning an interception 27 yards for a touchdown.  The Broncos closed out the period's scoring with rookie RB Peyton Hillis getting an 18-yard touchdown run.  Kansas City answered in the second quarter as QB Tyler Thigpen completed a 13-yard touchdown pass to TE Tony Gonzalez, but Denver did close out the half with QB Jay Cutler completing a 12-yard touchdown pass to WR Brandon Marshall.

The Broncos tied the game in the third quarter as kicker Matt Prater nailed a 33-yard field goal.  Afterwards, in the fourth quarter, Denver took the lead as Cutler hooked up with Marshall again on a 6-yard touchdown pass.  From there, the defense prevented any possible rally from the Chiefs.

With the win, the Broncos improved to 8–5.

Week 15: at Carolina Panthers

Coming off from their divisional home win over the Chiefs, the Broncos flew to Charlotte for a Week 15 interconference duel with the Carolina Panthers. In the first quarter, Denver drew first blood as QB Jay Cutler completes a 7-yard TD pass to RB P.J. Pope. Carolina soon responded with QB Jake Delhomme completing a 15-yard TD pass to WR Steve Smith, yet Denver answered with kicker Matt Prater nailing a 43-yard field goal. Carolina kicker John Kasay ties the game with a 39-yard field goal. In the second quarter, Carolina took the lead with rookie RB Jonathan Stewart getting a 2-yard TD run, while Kasay closed out the half with a 44-yard field goal.

In the third quarter, Carolina increased its lead with RB DeAngelo Williams's 56-yard TD run for the only score of the period. In the fourth quarter, Carolina sealed the win with Kasay's 42-yard field goal.

With the loss, Denver fell to 8–6.

Week 16: vs. Buffalo Bills

Hoping to rebound from their road loss to the Panthers, the Broncos went home for a Week 16 duel with the Buffalo Bills.  Denver stormed out to an early first-quarter lead as quarterback Jay Cutler got a 2-yard touchdown run, while kicker Matt Prater got a 23-yard field goal.  In the second quarter, the Broncos extended their lead as Prater made a 30-yard field goal.  The Bills got on the board with a 37-yard field goal from kicker Rian Lindell, followed by a 2-yard touchdown run from running back Marshawn Lynch.

Buffalo took the lead in the third quarter as Lindell got a 49-yard and a 28-yard field goal, yet Denver regained the lead with Cutler getting a 6-yard touchdown run.  In the fourth quarter, the Bills answered with quarterback Trent Edwards completing a 3-yard touchdown pass to wide receiver Stevie Johnson.  The Broncos tied the game with Prater nailing a 43-yard field goal, but Buffalo got the lead again as running back Fred Jackson made an 8-yard touchdown run.  Denver put together a late-game drive, but it ended up fizzling down the stretch.

With the loss, the Broncos fell to 8–7.

Week 17: at San Diego Chargers

Hoping to hold on to their divisional lead, the Broncos closed out the regular season at Qualcomm Stadium in a crucial Week 17 AFC West rematch with the San Diego Chargers.

Denver trailed early in the first quarter as Chargers kicker Nate Kaeding got a 28-yard field goal.  The Broncos responded with running back Tatum Bell's 26-yard touchdown run (with a failed PAT), but San Diego took the lead again as running back LaDainian Tomlinson got a 1-yard touchdown run.  Denver's deficit increased in the second quarter as quarterback Philip Rivers completed a 12-yard touchdown pass to tight end Brandon Manumaleuna, along with Tomlinson's 4-yard touchdown run.

In the third quarter, the Broncos tried to rally as Bell got a 37-yard touchdown run, yet the Chargers replied again as Rivers completed a 13-yard touchdown pass to running back Darren Sproles, followed by Tomlinson's 14-yard touchdown run.  Denver tried to come back in the fourth quarter as quarterback Jay Cutler completed a 25-yard touchdown pass to tight end Tony Scheffler and ran into the endzone for the 2-point conversion.  However, San Diego ran away with the division crown with Sproles' 2-yard touchdown run and fullback Jacob Hester's 4-yard touchdown.

With the loss, the Broncos' season ended at 8–8.  In the process, they became the first team in NFL history to enter the final three weeks of a regular season with a three-game lead and lose all three games.

Standings

References

External links
 Official website
 Denver Broncos team page

Denver Broncos seasons
Denver
Denver Broncos